At least two ships of the French Navy have borne the name Marceau:

 , lead ship of the  launched in 1887 and wrecked in 1922
 , a Type 1936A (Mob) destroyer launched in 1941 as the German destroyer Z31, acquired by France in 1946 and renamed. She was stricken in 1958.

French Navy ship names